Yin Li ( 220s), courtesy name Desi, was an official of the state of Eastern Wu in the Three Kingdoms period of China.

Life
Yin Li was from Yunyang Commandery, which is in present-day Danyang, Jiangsu. He came from a humble family background. He was physically weak and not active, but was known for being highly perceptive. He was also well versed in divination. He was a friend of Gu Shao. He served as a minor officer in Yunyang Commandery when he was young. When he was 18, he became an Assistant in the county office of Wu County (present-day Suzhou, Jiangsu). When Sun Quan was ruling the territories in Jiangdong as the King of Wu from 222–229, he recruited Yin Li to serve as a langzhong. In the summer of 224, Yin Li accompanied Zhang Wen on a diplomatic mission to Wu's ally state, Shu Han, where they met the Shu chancellor-regent Zhuge Liang, who was very impressed with Yin Li. After returning from Shu, Yin Li was supposed to assume the appointment of langzhong, but Zhang Wen arranged for him to work in the Imperial Secretariat instead. Yin Li became the Administrator of Lingling Commandery (零陵郡; around present-day Yongzhou, Hunan) later in his career. He died in office.

Family
Yin Li's son, Yin Ji, served as the Area Commander of Wunan County and was known for being a talented writer. He wrote the Tongyu. Yin Ji's son, Yin Ju, whose courtesy name was Yuanda, served as a Lieutenant-General in Wu. He became the Administrator of Cangwu Commandery later. Yin Ji's younger son, Yin You, whose courtesy name was Qingyuan, served as the Administrator of Wu Commandery.

See also
 Lists of people of the Three Kingdoms

References

 Chen, Shou (3rd century). Records of the Three Kingdoms (Sanguozhi).
 Pei, Songzhi (5th century). Annotations to Records of the Three Kingdoms (Sanguozhi zhu).

Year of birth unknown
Year of death unknown
Eastern Wu politicians
People from Zhenjiang